Allan Théo (born Allan Rouget; 11 April 1972, Saint-Amand-Montrond) is a French singer, particularly well known for his 1998 single "Emmène-moi", which peaked at No. 6.

Discography

Albums

Singles

 2006 : "J'ai pas demandé"
 2011 : "Je dérive"
 2011 : "Vivre au soleil"

References

External links
 Official site

1972 births
Living people
French pop singers
French-language singers
21st-century French singers
21st-century French male singers